Tempo Records was a mid-20th century United States based record label headquartered in Hollywood, California. It was run by Irving Fogel. Tempo bridged the 78 rpm, 45 rpm and 33 rpm generations, releasing discs in all three formats.

Tempo's roster included jazz harpist Robert Maxwell, pianist Mel Henke, cornetist Doc Evans, clarinetist Sid Phillips, Novachord virtuoso Lloyd Sloop, violinist Joe Venuti, Hammond organist Herb Kern, and pianist Ben Light.

Tempo released the 1949 version of "Sweet Georgia Brown" by Brother Bones and His Shadows which was used as the theme song for the Harlem Globetrotters basketball team.

Tempo Records (Impact)
Tempo was also the name of a gospel record label in the late 1960s and early 1970s. They were, for at least part of their existence, the contemporary arm of Impact Records, known formally as Tempo/Impact. It was based in Nashville, Tennessee and for a brief time also had a base in Shawnee Mission, Kansas. Some musicians who appeared on the Tempo of Kansas City label included the Hawaiians, Sue Ellen Chenault, Otis Skillings and the Couriers.

See also
 List of record labels
 Tempo Records (UK)

References

External links
 Tempo Records on the Internet Archive's Great 78 Project

American record labels